Peperomia peruviana is a species of flowering plant in the genus Peperomia. Its native range is in South America from Colombia to northern Argentina.

Description
It is a geophytic plant, storing water and reserves in an underground tuber. During dry periods parts above ground, such as leaves, will wither away but the plant will survive due to the tuber. When more rain falls, the plant regrows its stalks and leaves on the surface.

Habitat

References

peruviana
Flora of South America
Drought-tolerant plants
Caudiciform plants
Geophytic peperomias